Gregory Vincent Collins (born December 8, 1952) is an American character actor and a former professional American football linebacker who played in three National Football League seasons from 1975–1977.

Early life 
Collins was born in Troy, Michigan. He played college football at the University of Notre Dame, and played on the 1973 Notre Dame National Championship team under Ara Parseghian.

Career 
During his career in the NFL, Collins played for the San Francisco 49ers, the Seattle Seahawks and the Buffalo Bills.

As an actor he has appeared in films, including 976-EVIL, The Rock and New Alcatraz, and television shows, including 24, and True Blood. He also had four appearances in Full House as Second Prisoner, Tough Guy, and Sy. He also had an appearance on The Jeff Foxworthy Show as a dry ice delivery man.

Filmography

Film

Television

References

1952 births
Male actors from Michigan
American male film actors
American male television actors
American football linebackers
Buffalo Bills players
Living people
Notre Dame Fighting Irish football players
People from Troy, Michigan
San Francisco 49ers players
Seattle Seahawks players